Brigadier-General Arthur Robert Kenney-Herbert (1840–1916) was a British soldier who served in the British Indian Army, and wrote on cooking.

Life
He was the son of the Rev. Arthur Robert Kenney (1805–1884), son of Arthur Henry Kenney and rector of Bourton-on-Dunsmore, and his wife Mary Louise Palmer. Rev. Arthur Robert Kenney changed his name in later life to Arthur Robert Kenney-Herbert, his mother, Mary Lusinda, being daughter of Robert Herbert, of that family of Castle Island, a branch of that of Muckross, County Kerry, where the Herbert family, originally from Wales, had been settled since the 1600s. Of this family were the Anglo-Irish politician Henry Arthur Herbert, whose namesake grandson was also a politician, and the Royal Navy officer Thomas Herbert.

Kenney-Herbert entered Rugby School in 1855 as Arthur Robert Kenney. He served in the Indian Army from age 19. A cornet in 1859, he served in the Madras Cavalry, having arrived in India on 31 October of that year. He reached the rank of major in 1875, at this rank serving as deputy assistant quartermaster general at Madras until 1881, then as military secretary to the governor of Madras from 1881 to 1884. In 1885, he was promoted to lieutenant-colonel in the Madras Cavalry. He retired in 1892 with the rank of colonel. He died on 5 March 1916 at 19a Sinclair Gardens, West Kensington, London.

Kenney-Herbert wrote regular articles about Indian cookery for The Madras Mail, Madras Atheneum and The Daily News, using the pen-name Wyvern. These were collected and published in 1878 as Culinary Jottings for Madras, Or, A Treatise in Thirty Chapters on Reformed Cookery for Anglo-Indian Exiles, which went through seven editions. Upon retiring from the army and returning to England, he started a cookery school – the Common-sense Cookery Association – in June 1894. Its premises were at 17 Sloane Street in London.

Kenney-Herbert was not a vegetarian, but he did author the cookbook Vegetarian and Simple Diet in 1904. The book espouses ovo-lacto vegetarian recipes. It was positively reviewed in The Lancet journal, which noted that "we are glad to welcome the appearance of a book which will teach householders that appetising dishes can be made from vegetables with the aid of eggs and milk products."

Kenney-Herbert was fond of kedgeree. His recipe consisted of boiled rice, chopped boiled egg, cold minced fish that is heated with herbs, pepper and salt.

Family

Kenney-Herbert married Agnes Cleveland, daughter of General John Wheeler Cleveland. Arthur Cleveland Herbert Kenney-Herbert of the Northants Regiment was their son.

Selected publications

Culinary Jottings for Madras (1878)
Sweet Dishes (1884)
Vegetarian and Simple Diet (1904)
Common-Sense Cookery for English Households (1905)

References

External links
 

1840 births
1916 deaths
British chefs
British food writers